Le Collège La Mennais is a private Roman Catholic mixed secondary school in Papeete, Tahiti.

See also
 List of universities in Polynesia

References
 . ENSEIGNEMENT SECONDAIRE. Roman Catholic Archdiocese of Papeete. Accessed 01/31/2016.

Education in Tahiti
Papeete